The 1963 Toronto Argonauts finished in fourth place in the Eastern Conference with a 3–11 record and failed to make the playoffs.

Regular season

Standings

Schedule

References

Toronto Argonauts seasons
1963 Canadian Football League season by team